The 1959–60 Eintracht Frankfurt season was the 60th season in the club's football history. In 1959–60 the club played in the Oberliga Süd, the top tier of German football. It was the club's 15th season in the Oberliga Süd.

Matches

Legend

Friendlies

Oberliga

League fixtures and results

League table

DFB-Pokal / SFV-Pokal

1958–59

1959–60

European Cup

Final match

Squad

Squad and statistics

|}

Transfers

In:

Out:

See also
 1959–60 European Cup
 1960 European Cup Final

Notes

References

Sources

External links 
 Official English Eintracht website 
 German archive site
 1959–60 Oberliga Süd season at Fussballdaten.de 

1959-60
German football clubs 1959–60 season